2,6-Xylidine is an organic compound with the formula C6H3(CH3)2NH2. It is one of several isomeric xylidines.  It is a colorless viscous liquid.  Commercially significant derivatives are the anesthetics lidocaine, bupivacaine, mepivacaine, and etidocaine.

Production, occurrence, reactions
Many xylidines are prepared by nitration of a xylene followed by hydrogenation of the nitroaromatic, but this approach is not efficient for this isomer.  Instead, it is prepared from by treatment of the related xylenol with ammonia in the presence of oxide catalysts.

2,6-Xylidine is also a major metabolite of the drug xylazine in both horses, and humans.

2,6-Xylidine is the precursor to the NHC ligand called Xyl.

Uses
2,6-Xylidine is a precursor to the fungicide Metalaxyl and the herbicide metazachlor.

References

IARC Group 2B carcinogens
Anilines